Highway 135 (AR 135, Ark. 135, Hwy. 135) is a north–south state highway in northeast Arkansas. The route of  runs from Interstate 555 (I-555) near Tyronza north through Paragould to US 62.

Route description

AR 135 begins at Interstate 555 south of Tyronza and runs north to intersect AR 118 before meeting AR 14/AR 140 in Lepanto. The route continues north to Caraway, where it meets concurs with AR 158. The concurrency ends in Black Oak, when AR 135 begins to arrow west with AR 18. The route leaves AR 18 in Lake City, after which it angles north to Paragould. In Paragould, AR 135 meets US 412 and US 49/AR 1 before exiting town headed north. The route meets AR 34 north of Oak Grove Heights, which it follows until Lafe. The route leaves AR 34 and shoots northwest to Hooker, where it meets AR 141. After Hooker, the route straightens north, meeting AR 90 for a brief concurrency before terminating at US 62 east of Corning.

History
The section of Highway 135 north of Paragould was formerly Arkansas Highway 1W. Highway 1 was split into two directional routings in 1941, and when AR 1E became AR 1 in 1955, the former AR 1W from Paragould to Corning was designated Highway 135. The section south of Highway 18 was formerly Arkansas Highway 143, which became part of Arkansas Highway 135 in 1955. Arkansas Highway 143 has since been reassigned to another route.

Major intersections
Mileage resets at some concurrencies.

See also

 List of state highways in Arkansas

References

External links

Crowley's Ridge Parkway
135
Transportation in Clay County, Arkansas
Transportation in Craighead County, Arkansas
Transportation in Greene County, Arkansas
Transportation in Poinsett County, Arkansas